The 1934 Prairie View Panthers football team was an American football team that represented Prairie View Normal and Industrial College—now known as Prairie View A&M University—as a member of the Southwestern Athletic Conference (SWAC) during the 1934 college football season. Led by fourth-year head coach Sam B. Taylor the Panthers compiled an overall record of 5–4 with a mark of 2–3 in conference play.

Schedule

References

Prairie View
Prairie View A&M Panthers football seasons
Prairie View Panthers football